The Makoshika Dinosaur Museum was a private, non-profit regional museum located in Glendive, eastern Montana, United States. It opened in 2004, and before its closure, attracted between 1,500 and 2,000 visitors each summer. It was housed in a building dating from the  1900s and presented dinosaur casts/sculptures and fossils from around the world. It has since been reported closed.

Before its closure, the Makoshika Dinosaur Museum was a part of the Montana Dinosaur Trail.

References

External links 
 Makoshika Dinosaur Museum

Defunct museums in the United States
Museums in Glendive, Montana
Dinosaur museums in the United States
Paleontology in Montana